Federalist No. 61 is an essay by Alexander Hamilton, the sixty-first of The Federalist Papers. It was published on February 26, 1788 under the pseudonym Publius, the name under which all The Federalist papers were published. This is the last of three papers discussing the power of Congress over the election of its own members. It is titled "The Same Subject Continued: Concerning the Power of Congress to Regulate the Election of Members".

Hamilton's Argument vs. Counter Arguments 
Alexander Hamilton wanted electors to be voted in the same counties to increase the number of people coming in and out of congress. Hamilton said that if we hold elections at different times then we could change the members of congress gradually and make new members. This would make it less likely for congress to lean voting towards one side every single time. Also this would allow more opportunities for others to be able to run for the positions in congress and in turn, would make for new and positive changes to previous work done by the former elects. Not many people opposed this idea. For the most the part, the majority of people agreed with this because it would make voting for the people in the senate and congress easier. In addition, it would allow different approaches in congress, regarding political parties. However, some people did not like it because they wanted congress to be in their favor so that way when they would vote on things it would go their way, example, either towards the democrats or republicans.

Influence in Congress 
Alexander Hamilton and Thomas Jefferson clearly show what happens when factions are formed within the government. Thanks to Hamilton and Jefferson's constant arguments in which they constantly opposed each other they help crystallized to form the first institutional American Party system. Jeffersonians became Democratic-Republicans and Hamiltonians became federalist, both safest arouse public interest by taking sides. The party leaders,  moved rapidly to exploit the many political implications they discovered in any controversy applicable to any current situation. By simply declaring enough and loud enough the editors from either sides backed newspaper were able make considerable political issue out of a basically non partisan dispute.

Issues which seemed logically closets was that of courage and leadership, despite the efforts of local antagonists and the party organization, human feelings of gratitude prove too flimsy a foundation on which to build political platform.

Analysis / Reaction 
Alexander Hamilton more than anything wanted to eliminate the threat of factions within the congress. He knew Factions could be integral players in congress that shape members' preferences, develop policy agendas, and push those agendas on capitol hill.  Factions having power within congress would eliminate the power of the voter as well as the people who opposed the faction. Because [American] parties are neither as strong as some suggest nor as weak as others hold, it is often the case that factions are important actors within them. These factions are usually informally organized through networks that take on names and comprise a core cadre of a party. Because of that reasoning Factions lead to individual members seeking their own self-interest when comes to persevering power or writing policies. Such networks link members of congress to party activist, interest groups, and intellectuals in an effort to control the policymaking process.

To advance their goals legislators join factions in order to shift the distribution of power in congress- even sometimes going so far to change the institutions rules, yet, their strategies for achieving  their objectives vary. ]The end result is very obvious and is the reason why factions have been involved in the creation  and destruction of congressional regimes time after time, despite Hamilton's Disposition toward them.

References

External links 

 Text of The Federalist No. 61: congress.gov

61
1788 in American law
1788 in the United States
1788 essays